Arda Turan (born 30 January 1987) is a Turkish former professional footballer who played most notably as a winger.

Turan is mostly known for his ball control, dribbling skills and vision. At age 21, prior to the 2009–10 season, he was named captain of Galatasaray.

Following a successful UEFA Euro 2008 campaign, Turan was ranked eighth in a selection of the 100 Best Young Football Players in the World piece published by Spanish magazine Don Balón in July 2008. Turan was ranked 38th in "The 100 Best Footballers in the World" by The Guardian in 2014, the only player on the list to be born in Turkey. On 25 November 2014, Turan was nominated for the UEFA Team of the Year for 2014, among 39 other players.

Turan holds 100 senior national caps and 17 goals for the Turkey national team, making him Turkey's fifth-most capped player of all-time.

Club career

Galatasaray
Turan is a product of the Galatasaray youth. He was promoted to the Galatasaray first-team by manager Gheorghe Hagi in 2004–05 season, and he made his official debut against Bursaspor in a Turkish Cup match on 22 January 2005. He then had a spell on loan to fellow Süper Lig side Manisaspor in the second half of the 2005–06 season. In the 2005–06 season, Turan scored two goals for the team based in Manisa.

Turan was recalled to Galatasaray for the start of the 2006–07 season and quickly broke into the first team. It was during this time that he received his first senior international call up. He helped Galatasaray qualify for the following season's UEFA Champions League group stage. Turan continued his development in the 2007–08 season, scoring seven goals in the second half of the season.

At the start of the 2009–10 season, Turan was handed the captaincy of Galatasaray and given squad number 10, which had previously belonged to Metin Oktay and Hagi; Turan previously wore number 66.

As captain at the start of season, Turan guided his team to six consecutive league wins games which put Galatasaray comfortably at the top of the table. In the 2010–11 season, he was troubled with injuries and played a limited number of games. By the end of the season, he had played in only 12 league matches, scoring two goals; and in three Turkish Cup matches, where he scored one. His impressive performances over the last four years of his Galatasaray career lead to interest from Spanish club Atlético Madrid.

Atlético Madrid

In the late hours of 9 August 2011, it was announced Turan would be joining Atlético Madrid for a €12 million transfer fee plus bonuses, making him the most expensive Turkish footballer of all-time.

He was handed the number 11 shirt and made his 2011–12 La Liga debut on 28 August 2011 against Osasuna, entering as a substitute in the second half. He made his UEFA Europa League debut on 15 September against Celtic, starting the match and assisting a goal. On 18 September, he was again selected for the starting XI and provided two assists.

On 25 October, Galatasaray club president Ünal Aysal stated Turan will come back to Galatasaray in the future under right of first refusal that was signed between Galatasaray and Atlético during an interview with Lig TV. On 30 November, Turan scored his first goal for Atlético in a Europa League match against Celtic with a powerful volley. On 11 December, he scored his first La Liga goal with a driven volley just outside the box. In the Europa League match that followed, he netted again in a 3–1 win against Rennes.

Turan scored two goals in two minutes as Atlético defeated Espanyol 3–1 on 22 April 2012 to move his side into seventh place in the league standings and just three points behind Málaga for the final Champions League spot. On 9 May, in the 2012 UEFA Europa League Final against Athletic Bilbao, he made an assist to his teammate Radamel Falcao, which made the score 2–0.

Turan's number was changed from 11 to 10 before the 2012–13 season. He began his season with a game-tying long-distance screamer in Atlético's 1–1 La Liga season opener against Levante. He then won the 2012 UEFA Super Cup with Atlético against Champions League victors Chelsea, assisting Falcao for the third goal of the game in a 4–1 victory. On 16 September 2012, he scored the third goal of the game against Rayo Vallecano in a 4–3 home win. He was instrumental in Atlético's wins in their first two 2013–14 Champions League matches against Zenit Saint Petersburg and Porto, scoring a goal in each match. On 30 April 2014, he scored the last goal of a 3–1 away win against Chelsea in the semi-finals of the Champions League, sending Atlético to the final for the first time since 1974.

Entering the match as a substitute one hour into the match, Turan scored the decisive goal in the 76th minute for Atlético in their 1–2 away league win against derby rivals Real Madrid on 13 September 2014. After the match, Atlético manager Diego Simeone hailed Turan's impact on Atlético's game. On 1 October 2014, Turan scored the only goal of the match in the 1–0 win against Juventus in the group stage of the 2014–15 Champions League season. On 28 January 2015, in the 47th minute of the home leg of the Copa del Rey quarter-final against Barcelona, Turan threw his boot in the direction of the assistant referee, when he was denied a free-kick for an alleged foul by Ivan Rakitić. After the match, however, he was not handed a ban for the incident. Atlético were eliminated from the tournament as the match ended with a 2–3 defeat, 2–4 defeat on aggregate. On 22 April, Turan was sent off for a foul on Sergio Ramos as Atlético lost 0–1 at Real Madrid to be eliminated from the quarter-finals of the Champions League.

Barcelona
On 6 July 2015, Barcelona announced the signing of Turan from Atlético for €34 million, plus €7 million in variables. The contract would run for five seasons, but Turan would only be able to debut for the Catalans in January 2016, after Barcelona's transfer ban had been lifted. On 29 December 2015, Turan picked number 7 for his shirt. Starting the match in the starting line-up, Turan made his debut on 6 January 2016 in a Derbi barceloní encounter against Espanyol in the first leg of the round of 16 of the Copa del Rey, which ended 4–1 for Barcelona. He placed a shot in the second half that was saved by Espanyol goalkeeper Pau. Turan played his first Liga match with Barcelona on 9 January 2016, the 17th matchday of the season, at home against Granada. The match ended 4–0, with Turan assisting Lionel Messi's opening goal. On 17 August 2016, Turan scored twice and Lionel Messi once as Barcelona earned a 3–0 second-leg victory over Sevilla to win the 2016 Supercopa de España 5–0 on aggregate.

On 7 December 2016, Turan scored his first hat-trick for Barcelona during a Champions League group stage match against Borussia Mönchengladbach. He became the sixth player in Barça history to score a hat-trick in the Champions League, after Messi, Ronaldinho, Rivaldo, Samuel Eto'o and Neymar. This also marked Turan's first hat-trick in European competitions.

İstanbul Başakşehir (loan)
After not playing a single game for Barcelona in the 2017–18 season, Arda was loaned out to Turkish club İstanbul Başakşehir for the remainder of the season and two more, in the winter transfer window. He made his debut for the club in a league match on 21 January 2018, coming off the bench in the 65th minute mark and scoring the third goal in the 3–0 away win over Bursaspor. On 4 May 2018, Turan was sent off in a league match against Sivasspor for pushing an assistant referee after disagreeing with a ruling. He received a 16-match ban from the Turkish Federation's disciplinary board, the longest punishment ever issued to a player in the country. Later, however, the ban was reduced to 10 games by TFF's arbitration board. On 7 January 2020, Turan's loan was terminated six months early by Başakşehir.

Return to Galatasaray
On 5 August 2020, Galatasaray announced the signing of Turan on a two-year deal. Due to a long-term injury to goalkeeper Fernando Muslera, he was made the club's captain. He played his first official match of the 2020–21 season against Gaziantep in the Super League on 12 September. The next season, he played only seven matches and didn’t manage to score any goals.

Retirement
On 12 September 2022, Turan has shared via his social media account that he "hung up" his football boots.

His retirement announcement also came along with a formal retirement video, put together by the Libre Channel.

International career

Turan was a Turkish international regular, having made over 90 appearances for Turkey at senior level. He made his debut in the 1–0 friendly victory over Luxembourg on 16 August 2006, having worked his way through the youth national team at the under-19 and under-21 levels. He scored his first international goal on 25 May 2008 in a friendly against Uruguay.

Turan featured in nine of Turkey's 12 qualification matches for Euro 2008, and starred in the finals of the tournament itself. Turan scored two goals during Turkey's progression to the semi-finals. The first was a last-minute winner against co-hosts Switzerland in their second group stage match to eliminate them from the competition. His second came in the final group stage match against the Czech Republic, in which a draw would see a penalty shootout being played to determine who would go through to the quarter-finals because both teams had identical records. He scored Turkey's first goal in the second half, beating goalkeeper Petr Čech with a low shot, which led to Turkey coming from 2–0 down to win the match. He also successfully converted a spot-kick in the penalty shootout against Croatia in the quarter-finals, taking Turkey to the semi-finals, where they were eventually knocked out by losing finalists Germany.

Turan scored two goals during the qualification rounds of the 2010 FIFA World Cup, but ultimately Turkey failed to qualify from their group. After a qualifier in September 2008 between Armenia and Turkey – the two sides having historical political problems – both teams received a FIFA Fair Play Award for 2008.

Turan scored the Turkish national team's 600th international goal in a 2010 World Cup qualification game, against Estonia on 5 September 2009. he scored four goals for Turkey during the qualification rounds of the Euro 2012, two against Kazakhstan, one against Belgium, and one against Austria. Turkey, however, could not qualify for the final stages of Euro 2012 after being eliminated by Croatia in the play-offs.

In June 2017, Turan attacked verbally and tried to strangulate journalist Bilal Meşe in a plane trip back from a game against Macedonia. He then stated that he didn't feel any remorse and that he would not be playing for Turkey anymore. However, after the sacking of head coach Fatih Terim and the new coach Mircea Lucescu expressing his wish for Turan to return, he declared in August that he would resume playing for Turkey.

He was granted his 100th and final international appearance for Turkey in the 3–0 defeat to Iceland national football team in 2018 World Cup qualifying group match in October 2017.

Outside football

On 16 November 2008, Turan collapsed during a match against İstanbul BB. After being rushed to hospital, he was diagnosed with cardiac arrhythmia. The day after the incident, doctors declared that Turan was in good health and that extreme exhaustion caused the arrhythmia. In November 2009, he suffered a minor bout of swine flu but recovered within a few days to resume training.

In January 2009, he was involved in a car crash in Istanbul. Turan suffered no serious injuries and continued training with only cuts and bruises. Turan dated Turkish actress Sinem Kobal from August 2009. The pair became engaged in January 2010, splitting in late 2013.

Turan married Aslıhan Doğan on 11 March 2018. President of Turkey Recep Tayyip Erdoğan attended the wedding where he was acting as a witness of the marriage. In October 2018, the couple's first child, a son named Hamza Arda, was born. Another son named Asil Aslan was born in June 2020.

Arda Turan received a suspended sentence of 2 years and 8 months after being found guilty of firing a gun to cause panic, illegal possession of weapons and intentional injury. Turan got into a brawl with Berkay Şahin in 2018 which ended with a broken nose for the pop star. Turan appeared at the hospital with a gun, allegedly begging for forgiveness from Şahin, panic ensued after the footballer fired the weapon at the ground. Turan will not serve his jail term if no further incidents occur for five years.

Charity
Turan is also known for his humanitarian work, especially in the helping of sick children.

On 11 May 2014, Turan was announced as a goodwill ambassador for the Khojaly massacre. His ambassador activities are aimed to raise awareness about this issue and promoting world peace.

Media
In January 2010, Turan was voted as the third-most popular European footballer of 2009, as well as the 14th-most popular footballer in the world, by the International Federation of Football History & Statistics (IFFHS). He was featured on the cover of the video game FIFA 15 in Turkey. Together with, at the time teammate, Lionel Messi.

Politics
Turan is known for his long-standing support of President of Turkey Recep Tayyip Erdoğan.

Career statistics

Club

International

Source:

International goals
Turkey score listed first, score column indicates score after each Turan goal.

Honours

Club

Galatasaray
Süper Lig: 2007–08
Turkish Cup: 2004–05

Atlético Madrid
La Liga: 2013–14
Copa del Rey: 2012–13
UEFA Champions League runner-up: 2013–14
UEFA Europa League: 2011–12
UEFA Super Cup: 2012

Barcelona
La Liga: 2015–16
Copa del Rey: 2015–16, 2016–17
Supercopa de España: 2016

İstanbul Başakşehir
Süper Lig: 2019–20

International
Turkey
 UEFA European Championship third place: 2008

See also
 List of footballers with 100 or more caps

References

External links

 FC Barcelona official profile
 
 
 
 
 
 
 

1987 births
Living people
People from Fatih
Footballers from Istanbul
Turkish Muslims
Turkish footballers
Association football midfielders
Galatasaray A2 footballers
Galatasaray S.K. footballers
Manisaspor footballers
Atlético Madrid footballers
FC Barcelona players
İstanbul Başakşehir F.K. players
Süper Lig players
La Liga players
UEFA Europa League winning players
Turkey youth international footballers
Turkey under-21 international footballers
Turkey international footballers
Competitors at the 2005 Mediterranean Games
Mediterranean Games silver medalists for Turkey
Mediterranean Games medalists in football
UEFA Euro 2008 players
UEFA Euro 2016 players
FIFA Century Club
Turkish expatriate footballers
Turkish expatriate sportspeople in Spain
Expatriate footballers in Spain
People convicted of illegal possession of weapons